8Radio.com is an Irish radio station, started in 2012 by Phantom FM founder Simon Maher. 8radio.com is a music-driven station. It is mostly an online station but has occasionally done trial broadcasts (temporary licence runs) on FM, mostly in Dublin but sometimes Cork, Galway and Limerick. Some of the presenters had previous involvement in Phantom FM, including Steve Conway, Pearl, Amber, Brian  Daly and Neil Murray. Some have had involvement in community stations including Dublin City FM - examples: Sinead Ni Chonaill (Dublin City FM) and Angela Hughes (Radio na Life). There are even some presenters with connections to RTE. As well as giving some new broadcasting talent an opportunity, Simon presents his own programmes too.

Simon Maher describes the station as finding "a niche amongst music lovers and those who may not currently consume much, if any, traditional FM radio". He also called for changes to the business and regulatory model in the BAI to help make music stations of this nature more viable.

References

Radio stations in the Republic of Ireland
2012 establishments in Ireland